The Diocese of Pskov and Porkhov is an eparchy of the Russian Orthodox Church. The ruling bishop is Metropolitan Tikhon (Shevkunov). As of 2008 it consists of 10 monasteries, 212 churches, 108 chapels, 178 priests, 20 deacons.

The diocese was established on January 26 (February 4) 1589 after separating from the Novgorod Diocese.

The cathedra in 1682 was formed by 13 metropolitan, 6 archbishops and 49 bishops. Therefore, suggested to be in Pskov Department of Metropolitan, and was appointed the first metropolitan Markell.

References

Eparchies of the Russian Orthodox Church